Storm is the given name of:

 Storm Bull (1913–2007), American musician, composer, educator and professor
 Storm Bull (Wisconsin engineer) (1856–1907), mayor of Madison, Wisconsin, from 1901 to 1902
 Storm Constantine (1956-2021), British science fiction and fantasy writer
 Storm Huntley (born 1987), Scottish television presenter
 Storm Murphy (born 1999), American basketball player
 Storm Reid (born 2003), American actress
 Storm Roux (born 1993), South African-born New Zealand footballer 
 Storm Sanders (born 1994), Australian tennis player
 Storm Thorgerson (1944-2013), English graphic designer best known for his album covers
 Storm Uru (born 1985), New Zealand rower
 Storm Weinholdt (1920-1945), Norwegian resistance member during World War II
 Margaret Storm Jameson (1891–1986), English journalist and author

See also
 Storm Davis (born 1961), American retired Major League Baseball pitcher